Sidi Mansour may refer to:

Sidi Mansour, Morocco
Sidi Mansour, a village in Bizerte Governorate, Tunisia
Sidi Mansour, a small town in Sfax Governorate, Tunisia
Sidi Mansour (album), a 2000 album by Saber Rebaï
"Sidi Mansour" (song), a song by Saber Saber Rebaï
"Sidi Mansour", a song by Cheikha Rimitti